Li'l Ol' Groovemaker...Basie! is a 1963 album by the Count Basie Orchestra released by Verve Records. The music was composed and arranged by Quincy Jones.

Track listing
All tracks composed by Quincy Jones
 "Li'l Ol' Groovemaker" – 2:48
 "Pleasingly Plump" – 4:03
 "Boody Rumble" – 3:36
 "Belly Roll" – 2:29
 "Count 'Em" – 5:21
 "Nasty Magnus" – 6:04
 "Dum Dum" – 2:41
 "Lullaby for Jolie (Jolie Ann)" – 2:29
 "Kansas City Wrinkles" – 5:41

Personnel
The Count Basie Orchestra

 Count Basie – piano, 
 Sonny Cohn, Al Aarons, Snooky Young, Fip Ricard, Don Rader - trumpet
 Grover Mitchell, Benny Powell, Urbie Green, Henry Coker - trombone
 Marshal Royal, Frank Wess – alto saxophone
 Frank Foster, Eric Dixon – tenor saxophone
 Charlie Fowlkes – baritone saxophone
 Freddie Green – guitar
 Buddy Catlett – double bass
 Sonny Payne – drums
 Quincy Jones - arranger

References

1963 albums
Count Basie Orchestra albums
Albums arranged by Quincy Jones
Verve Records albums